The 2002 Three Days of De Panne was the 26th edition of the Three Days of De Panne cycle race and was held on 2 April to 4 April 2002. The race started in Mouscron and finished in De Panne. The race was won by Peter Van Petegem.

General classification

References

Three Days of Bruges–De Panne
2002 in Belgian sport